The Procession is a Canadian animated short film, directed by Pascal Blanchet and Rodolphe Saint-Gelais and released in 2019. The film centres on Catherine, a woman who has recently died in a car accident, and is narrating a love letter to her husband Philippe as he prepares for her funeral.

The film received a Prix Iris nomination for Best Animated Short Film at the 22nd Quebec Cinema Awards. In 2020, it was selected for inclusion in the online We Are One: A Global Film Festival.

References

External links
 

2019 films
2010s animated short films
Canadian animated short films
National Film Board of Canada animated short films
2010s Canadian films